Neil McGarry (born 1983) is an Irish hurler who currently plays as a full-forward for the Antrim senior team.

McGarry made his first appearance for the team during the 2008 National League and was a regular member of the starting fifteen for the following two seasons. During that time he won two Ulster medals.

At club level McGarry is an All-Ireland medalist with Loughgiel Shamrocks. He has also won two Ulster medals and two county club championship medals.

References

 

1983 births
Living people
Loughgiel Shamrocks hurlers
Antrim inter-county hurlers
Ulster inter-provincial hurlers